The 2016 Kansas State Wildcats baseball team represents Kansas State University during the 2016 NCAA Division I baseball season. The Wildcats will their home games at Tointon Family Stadium as a member of the Big 12 Conference. They are led by head coach Brad Hill, in his 13th season at Kansas State.

Previous season
The 2015 Kansas State Wildcats baseball team notched a 27–30 (10–14) record and finished sixth in the Big 12 Conference standings. The Wildcats reached the 2015 Big 12 Conference baseball tournament championship game, where they were eliminated in the second round. Kansas State did not receive an at-large bid to the 2015 NCAA Division I baseball tournament.

Personnel

Roster

Coaching staff

Schedule and results

! style="background:#512888;color:white;"| Regular Season
|- valign="top" 

|- bgcolor="#bbffbb"
| February 19 || 8:0  pm || || at * ||  || Riverside Sports Complex • Riverside, CA || W1–0 || Fischer(1–0) || Sodders(0–1) || Kalmus (1) || 423 || 1–0 || –
|- bgcolor="#ffbbbb"
| February 20 || 3:00 pm || || at UC Riverside* ||  || Riverside Sports Complex • Riverside, CA || L3–6 || Landazuri(1–0) || Rigler(0–1) || Morton(1) || 275 || 1–1 || –
|- bgcolor="#bbffbb"
| February 21 || 3:00 pm || || at UC Riverside* ||  || Riverside Sports Complex • Riverside, CA || W8–1 || MaVorhis(1–0) || Delgado(0–1) || – || 284 || 2–1 || –
|- bgcolor="#ffbbbb"
| February 22 || 8:00 pm || || at UC Riverside* ||  || Riverside Sports Complex • Riverside, CA || L3–6 || Musgraves(1–0) || Kalmus(0–1) || – || 227 || 2–2 || –
|- bgcolor="#ffbbbb"
| February 25 || 2:00 pm || || #8 Oregon State* ||  || Surprise Stadium • Surprise, AZ (Big 12/Pac-12 Challenge) || L5–7 || Fehmel(2–0) || Floyd(0–1) || Engelbrekt(3) || 2,309 || 2–3 || –
|- bgcolor="#ffbbbb"
| February 26 || 2:00 pm || || #8 Oregon State* ||  || Surprise Stadium • Surprise, AZ (Big 12/Pac-12 Challenge) || L0–14 || Thompson(1–1) || Rigler(0–2) || – || 2,643 || 2–4 || –
|- bgcolor="#bbffbb"
| February 27 || 6:00 pm || || * || || Surprise Stadium • Surprise, AZ (Big 12/Pac-12 Challenge) || W9–2 || McVorhis(2–0) || Carroll(1–1) || – || 3,133 || 3–4 || –
|- bgcolor="#bbffbb"
| February 28 || 2:30 pm || || Utah* ||  || Surprise Stadium • Surprise, AZ (Big 12/Pac-12 Challenge) || W20–4 || Kalmus(1–1) || Ottesen(0–2) || – || 1,736 || 4–4 || –
|-

|- bgcolor="#bbffbb"
| March 4 || 3:00 pm || || * ||  || Tointon Family Stadium • Manhattan, KS || W18–8 || Floyd(1–1) || Holdridge(0–2) || – || 2,233 || 5–4 || –
|- bgcolor="#bbffbb"
| March 5 || 2:00 pm || || Arkansas–Pine Bluff* ||  || Tointon Family Stadium • Manhattan, KS || W15–9 || Rigler(1–2) || Medina(0–2) || – || 2,066 || 6–4 || –
|- bgcolor="#bbffbb"
| March 6 || 1:00 pm || || Arkansas–Pine Bluff* ||  || Tointon Family Stadium • Manhattan, KS || W13–8 || Kalmus(2–1) || Lewington(0–2) || – || 2,078 || 7–4 || –
|- bgcolor="#bbffbb"
| March 9 || 3:00 pm || COX KS || * ||  || Tointon Family Stadium • Manhattan, KS || W8–2 || Heinen(1–0) || Elman(0–1) || – || 1,920 || 8–4 || –
|- bgcolor="#ffbbbb"
| March 11 || 3:00 pm || || * ||  || Tointon Family Stadium • Manhattan, KS || L1–14 || Keller(1–3) || Fischer(1–1) || – || 2,005 || 8–5 || –
|- bgcolor="#bbffbb"
| March 12 || 2:00 pm || || Milwaukee* ||  || Tointon Family Stadium • Manhattan, KS || W3–1 || Rigler(2–2) || Peters(1–2) || Benenati(1) || 2,095 || 9–5 || –
|- bgcolor="#bbffbb"
| March 13 || 1:00 pm || FCS || Milwaukee* ||  || Tointon Family Stadium • Manhattan, KS || W7–0 || MaVorhis(3–0) || Reuss(1–2) || – || 2,014 || 10–5 || –
|- bgcolor="#ffbbbb"
| March 15 || 6:30 pm || FCS || * ||  || Tointon Family Stadium • Manhattan, KS || L5–6 || Polivka(1–1) || Ruder(0–1) || Starks(1) || 2,042 || 10–6 || –
|- bgcolor="#bbffbb"
| March 16 || 3:00 pm || || Stephen F. Austin* ||  || Tointon Family Stadium • Manhattan, KS || W11–5 || Wiley(1–0) || Adams(1–1) || – || 1,991 || 11–6 || –
|- bgcolor="#ffbbbb"
| March 18 || 6:30 pm || || * ||  || Tointon Family Stadium • Manhattan, KS || L5–7 || Davis(2–0) || Floyd(1–2) || – || 1,912 || 11–7 || –
|- bgcolor="#ffbbbb"
| March 19 || 2:00 pm || || Western Carolina* ||  || Tointon Family Stadium • Manhattan, KS || L2–6 || Sammons(3–1) || Rigler(2–3) || Nobles(2) || 1,794 || 11–8 || –
|- bgcolor="#ffbbbb"
| March 20 || 1:00 pm || || Western Carolina* ||  || Tointon Family Stadium • Manhattan, KS || L2–10 || Baker(1–2) || Ruder(0–2) || – || 1,890 || 11–9 || –
|- bgcolor="#ffbbbb"
| March 22 || 6:30 pm || COX KS || at Creighton* ||  || TD Ameritrade Park • Omaha, NE || L4–5 || Decaster(1–0) || Wiley(1–1) || Gerber(5) || 2,324 || 11–10 || –
|- bgcolor="#ffbbbb"
| March 24 || 6:00 pm || FS1 || Oklahoma State ||  || Tointon Family Stadium • Manhattan, KS || L1–2 || Hatch(2–0) || MaVorhis(3–1) || Buffett(2) || 1,884 || 11–11 || 0–1
|- bgcolor="#ffbbbb"
| March 25 || 6:30 pm || FCS || Oklahoma State ||  || Tointon Family Stadium • Manhattan, KS || L4–5 || Williams(1–0) || Rigler(2–4) || Buffett(3) || 2,337 || 11–12 || 0–2
|- bgcolor="#ffbbbb"
| March 26 || 2:00 pm || || Oklahoma State ||  || Tointon Family Stadium • Manhattan, KS || L4–510 || Buffett(4–1) || Benenati(0–1) || – || 2,006 || 11–13 || 0–3
|- bgcolor="#bbffbb"
| March 29 || 6:30 pm || FCS || * ||  || Tointon Family Stadium • Manhattan, KS || W11–3 || Wiley(2–1) || Sasse(1–3) || – || 1,916 || 12–13 || –
|- bgcolor="#ffbbbb"
| March 30 || 4:00 pm || || * ||  || Tointon Family Stadium • Manhattan, KS || L10–1411 || Womack(2–1) || Fischer(1–2) || – || 1,865 || 12–14 || –
|-

|- bgcolor="#ffbbbb"
| April 2 || 1:00 pm || || at #29 Texas Tech ||  || Dan Law Field at Rip Griffin Park • Lubbock, TX || L3–10 || Martin(4–0) || MaVorhis(3–2) || Shetter(1) || 4,145 || 12–15 || 0–4
|- bgcolor="#ffbbbb"
| April 2 || 4:15 pm || || at #29 Texas Tech ||  || Dan Law Field at Rip Griffin Park • Lubbock, TX || L4–10 || Gingery(3–1) || Rigler(2–5) || Howard(2) || 4,145 || 12–16 || 0–5
|- bgcolor="#ffbbbb"
| April 3 || 12:00 pm || || at #29 Texas Tech ||  || Dan Law Field at Rip Griffin Park • Lubbock, TX || L5–6 || Dugger(1–0) || Fischer(1–3) || Moseley(2) || 3,655 || 12–17 || 0–6
|- bgcolor="#bbffbb"
| April 5 || 6:30 pm || || at * ||  || Haymarket Park • Lincoln, NE || W4–2 || Erickson(1–0) || Meyers(1–1) || Floyd(1) || 2,926 || 13–17 || –
|- bgcolor="#ffbbbb"
| April 8 || 6:30 pm || COX KS || Texas ||  || Tointon Family Stadium • Manhattan, KS || L3–6 || Cooper(2–1) || Rigler(2–6) || Shugart(2) || 2,331 || 13–18 || 0–7
|- bgcolor="#ffbbbb"
| April 9 || 2:00 pm || || Texas ||  || Tointon Family Stadium • Manhattan, KS || L5–12 || Culbreth(6–2) || MaVorhis(3–3) || – || 2,331 || 13–19 || 0–8
|- bgcolor="#bbffbb"
| April 10 || 1:00 pm || || Texas ||  || Tointon Family Stadium • Manhattan, KS || W3–2 || Benenati(1–1) || Shugart(1–1) || – || 2,331 || 14–19 || 1–8
|- align="center" bgcolor=""
| April 15 || 5:30 pm || || at West Virginia ||  || Monongalia County Ballpark • Granville, WV || W8–6 ||  ||  ||  ||  || 15–19 || 2–8
|- align="center" bgcolor=""
| April 16 || 3:00 pm || || at West Virginia ||  || Monongalia County Ballpark • Granville, WV ||  ||  ||  ||  ||  ||  || 
|- align="center" bgcolor=""
| April 17 || 12:00 pm || || at West Virginia ||  || Monongalia County Ballpark • Granville, WV ||  ||  ||  ||  ||  ||  || 
|- align="center" bgcolor=""
| April 19 || 6:30 pm || FCS || Nebraska* ||  || Tointon Family Stadium • Manhattan, KS ||  ||  ||  ||  ||  ||  || 
|- align="center" bgcolor=""
| April 20 || 6:30 pm || COX KS || at Omaha* ||  || Werner Park • Papillion, NE ||  ||  ||  ||  ||  ||  || 
|- align="center" bgcolor=""
| April 22 || 6:30 pm || FCS || Baylor ||  || Tointon Family Stadium • Manhattan, KS ||  ||  ||  ||  ||  ||  || 
|- align="center" bgcolor=""
| April 23 || 4:00 pm || || Baylor ||  || Tointon Family Stadium • Manhattan, KS ||  ||  ||  ||  ||  ||  || 
|- align="center" bgcolor=""
| April 24 || 1:00 pm || || Baylor ||  || Tointon Family Stadium • Manhattan, KS ||  ||  ||  ||  ||  ||  || 
|- align="center" bgcolor=""
| April 26 || 6:30 pm || COX KS || at * ||  || Eck Stadium • Wichita, KS ||  ||  ||  ||  ||  ||  || 
|- align="center" bgcolor=""
| April 27 || 6:30 pm || FCS || * ||  || Tointon Family Stadium • Manhattan, KS ||  ||  ||  ||  ||  ||  || 
|- align="center" bgcolor=""
| April 29 || 6:00 pm || || at * ||  || Duane Banks Field • Iowa City, IA ||  ||  ||  ||  ||  ||  || 
|- align="center" bgcolor=""
| April 30 || 2:00 pm || || at Iowa* ||  || Duane Banks Field • Iowa City, IA ||  ||  ||  ||  ||  ||  || 
|-

|- align="center" bgcolor=""
| May 1 || 1:00 pm || || at Iowa* ||  || Duane Banks Field • Iowa City, IA ||  ||  ||  ||  ||  ||  || 
|- align="center" bgcolor=""
| May 3 || 6:30 pm || FCS || Wichita State* ||  || Tointon Family Stadium • Manhattan, KS ||  ||  ||  ||  ||  ||  || 
|- align="center" bgcolor=""
| May 6 || 6:00 pm || FSOK || at Oklahoma ||  || L. Dale Mitchell Baseball Park • Norman, OK ||  ||  ||  ||  ||  ||  || 
|- align="center" bgcolor=""
| May 7 || 2:00 pm || FSOK || at Oklahoma ||  || L. Dale Mitchell Baseball Park • Norman, OK ||  ||  ||  ||  ||  ||  || 
|- align="center" bgcolor=""
| May 8 || 1:00 pm || FSOK || at Oklahoma ||  || L. Dale Mitchell Baseball Park • Norman, OK ||  ||  ||  ||  ||  ||  || 
|- align="center" bgcolor=""
| May 13 || 6:30 pm || COX KS || Kansas ||  || Tointon Family Stadium • Manhattan, KS ||  ||  ||  ||  ||  ||  || 
|- align="center" bgcolor=""
| May 14 || 3:30 pm || COX KS || Kansas ||  || Tointon Family Stadium • Manhattan, KS ||  ||  ||  ||  ||  ||  || 
|- align="center" bgcolor=""
| May 15 || 1:00 pm || COX KS || Kansas ||  || Tointon Family Stadium • Manhattan, KS ||  ||  ||  ||  ||  ||  || 
|- align="center" bgcolor=""
| May 19 || 6:30 pm || || at TCU ||  || Lupton Stadium • Fort Worth, TX ||  ||  ||  ||  ||  ||  || 
|- align="center" bgcolor=""
| May 20 || 6:30 pm || FSSW+ || at TCU ||  || Lupton Stadium • Fort Worth, TX ||  ||  ||  ||  ||  ||  || 
|- align="center" bgcolor=""
| May 21 || 4:00 pm || FSSW || at TCU ||  || Lupton Stadium • Fort Worth, TX ||  ||  ||  ||  ||  ||  || 
|-

|- 
! style="background:#512888;color:white;"| Post-Season
|-

|- align="center" bgcolor=""
| May 25 || TBD || || TBD ||  || Chickasaw Bricktown Ballpark • Oklahoma City, OK ||  ||  ||  ||  ||  ||  || 
|- align="center" bgcolor=""
| May 26 || TBD || || TBD ||  || Chickasaw Bricktown Ballpark • Oklahoma City, OK ||  ||  ||  ||  ||  ||  || 
|-

| style="font-size:88%" | Legend:       = Win       = Loss      Bold = Kansas State team member
|-
| style="font-size:88%" | All rankings from Collegiate Baseball.

References

Kansas State Wildcats
Kansas State Wildcats baseball seasons
Kansas State Wildcats Baseball